German submarine U-646 was a Type VIIC U-boat of Nazi Germany's Kriegsmarine during World War II. The submarine was laid down on 23 December 1941 at the Blohm & Voss yard at Hamburg, launched on 3 September 1942, and commissioned on 29 October 1942 under the command of Leutnant zur See d.R. Heinrich Wulff.

Attached to 5th U-boat Flotilla based at Kiel, U-646 completed her training period on 31 March 1943 and was assigned to front-line service.

Design
German Type VIIC submarines were preceded by the shorter Type VIIB submarines. U-646 had a displacement of  when at the surface and  while submerged. She had two shafts and two  propellers.

U-646 was fitted with five  torpedo tubes (four fitted at the bow and one at the stern), fourteen torpedoes, one  SK C/35 naval gun, 220 rounds, and one twin  C/30 anti-aircraft gun. The boat had a complement of between forty-four and sixty.

Service history
While on patrol in the North Atlantic, U-646 was detected by Hudson J of No. 269 Squadron RAF south-east of Iceland on 17 May 1943. In the subsequent attack, the U-boat was sunk and all 46 crew members perished.

References

Bibliography

External links

World War II submarines of Germany
German Type VIIC submarines
1942 ships
Ships built in Hamburg
U-boats commissioned in 1942
U-boats sunk in 1943
U-boats sunk by British aircraft
U-boats sunk by depth charges
World War II shipwrecks in the Atlantic Ocean